The  is a constituency that represents Chiba Prefecture in the House of Councillors in the Diet of Japan. It has six Councillors in the 242-member house.

Outline
The constituency represents the entire population of Chiba Prefecture. The district elects six Councillors to six-year terms, two sets of three each at alternating elections held every three years. Prior to the 2007 election the district elected four Councilors in two sets of two. The district has 5,092,741 registered voters as of September 2015. The Councillors currently representing Chiba are:
 Kuniko Inoguchi (Liberal Democratic Party (LDP), first term; term ends in 2016)
 Hiroyuki Konishi (Democratic Party, first term; term ends in 2016)
 Kenichi Mizuno (Democratic Party, first term; term ends in 2016)
 Junichi Ishii (LDP, second term; term ends in 2019)
 Hiroyuki Nagahama (Democratic Party, second term; term ends in 2019)
 Toshiro Toyoda (LDP, first term; term ends in 2019)

Elected Councillors

Election results

See also
List of districts of the House of Councillors of Japan

References 

Districts of the House of Councillors (Japan)